Purple Heart is a 2006 action-war film directed, co-writer and co-produced by Bill Birrell. It stars William Sadler, Mel Harris and Emilio Rivera. It is released on November 11, 2006.

Plot 
The film is the story of Sgt. Oscar Padilla, member of an elite military unit designed for covert operations. His first mission: assassinate Saddam Hussein prior to the beginning of the 2003 Iraq War. Unfortunately the mission is compromised; Padilla is captured and tortured by the Iraqis. Later, Padilla is rescued, but is severely damaged by his ordeal. Back in the United States, he escapes from the lock down ward of the military hospital where he is being treated. Given what he knows about the illegal attempt at political assassination, he is considered dangerous. As the leader of the unit that trained Padilla, Colonel Allen is sent with specific orders to go find him and "solve the problem" permanently. Allen intends to convince Padilla to come back. As it turns out, there was no real-life mission at all: it was the final, most severe training exercise that broke Padilla's soul – and mind. The film raises questions about the moral obligations of the use of military power, and the methods that the U.S. uses to train and ultimately sacrifice its own soldiers.

Cast 
 William Sadler as Colonel Allen
 Demetrius Navarro as Sergeant Oscar Padilla
 Mel Harris as Dr. Harrison
 Ed Lauter as Civilian
 Emilio Rivera as Deputy
 Russell Gannon as Al-Sadr
 Mary L. Carter as News Reporter
 Douglas Tait as Halliday
 Ric Smith as Hank
 Tulsi Ram as Toufig Tulsiram / Iraqi Soldier
 H. Charles Parrish as Drill Instructor
 Dennis Hayden as Earl
 Charles Fathy as Iraqi Officer
 Dave Erickson as News Anchor
 Icarus the Wonder Dog as Claudia's Dog
 Joseph Aguilar as M.A. Guiterrez

Production 
Purple Heart was produced by the company of Claymore Inc..

Home media 
The DVD version of the film was distributed by Indican Pictures in 2008.

Release 
Purple Heart was released in the Egyptian Theatre in Los Angeles, CA for the Artivist Film Festival.

External links 
 
 

2006 films
2000s English-language films